"The five royal tribes of Wales" and "The fifteen tribes of Gwynedd" refer to a class of genealogical lists which were compiled by Welsh bards in the mid-15th century. These non-identical lists were constructed on the premise that many of the leading Welsh families of their time could trace their descent to the "five royal tribes of Wales" or the "fifteen noble tribes of Gwynedd".

In the surviving manuscripts, the first occurrence of the "fifteen tribes of Gwynedd" is probably in parts written by Gutun Owain in NLW, Peniarth MS 131. The Welsh headings which stand above the pedigrees of Eunydd of Dyffryn Clwyd and Hwfa ap Cynddelw on p. 85 and the tribe of Gollwyn ap Tangno on p. 90 all read something like "one of the 15 tribes". A related list is found in British Library Add MS 14919, f. 121v.

A more developed example is to be found on two folios of a 16th or 17th-century manuscript in the British Library, Harley MS 1970, folios 34r-v, where the list is accompanied by a number of heraldic designs.

The basic idea of five regal and fifteen common (i.e. noble) tribes was later used by the antiquarian and genealogist Philip Yorke as a model for his Royal Tribes of Wales (1799).

Notes

References

Further reading
 
 

Medieval genealogies and succession lists of Wales